Kiyevsky or Kievsky (masculine), Kiyevskaya (feminine), or Kiyevskoye (neuter) may refer to:
Kiyevsky District, name of Kulundinsky District in West Siberian Krai and later in Altai Krai, Russia, in 1935–1938
Kiyevsky (inhabited locality), several inhabited localities in Russia
Moscow Kiyevskaya railway station, a rail terminal in Moscow, Russia
Stations of Moscow Metro:
Kiyevskaya (Arbatsko-Pokrovskaya line)
Kiyevskaya (Filyovskaya line)
Kiyevskaya (Koltsevaya line)
Kyivska (Kharkiv Metro) (Kievskaya), a station of the Kharkiv Metro, Kharkiv, Ukraine